Jacques de la Faye was a 17th and 18th century French writer whose Defensio Religionis ('"Defense of Religion'), a 251-page critique of the pantheism of John Toland, was published at Utrecht by G. Broedelet in 1709. De la Faye's was the first recorded use of the word "pantheism".

References

External links
 

18th-century French writers
18th-century French male writers
17th-century births
18th-century deaths
French religious writers
French male non-fiction writers